Rosada may refer to:

Água Rosada or Álvaro XIV, ruler in Kongo from February 1891 to 1896
Ariel Rosada (born 1978), Argentine midfielder
Casa Rosada (the Pink House), the official seat of the executive branch of the government of Argentina
Dada Rosada, mayor of Bandung City, West Java, Indonesia (2003–2008)
Hombre de la esquina rosada, 1962 Argentine film
Marcelo Rosada Silva (born 1976), former Brazilian football player
Nymphargus rosada, species of frog in the family Centrolenidae, formerly placed in Cochranella

de:Rosada